Esmael Barari; (born 1965), is an Iranian filmmaker, film director, screenwriter, film editor and film producer.
He is director of World Iranian Film Center, a member of The Union of Iranian Cinema Producers and a member of international jury of Mostra Valencia Film Festival.

Film career
Esmael Barari graduated in filmmaking from Art University. In 1988, his short film, Reaction, won top prize at the first National Students Film Festival of Tehran and the silver plaque at the 1989 Ebensee Festival of Nations. His other short films are Nader's Gift (1989) and Loneliness And The Cold (1990) which was presented in FIPA Cannes-91 and received The Golden Butterfly for the Best Film at 5th International Festival of Film and Video for Children and Young Adults. Up to now he has made more than twenty feature, documentary and short films & TV series. His younger brother, Ahmad Barari, is a professor in Mechanical Engineering at the University of Ontario Institute of Technology (UOIT) in Canada.

Cinematic style
Barari is part of a generation of filmmakers in the Modern Iranian Cinema, a Persian cinema movement that started in the 1980s and includes pioneering directors such as Mohsen Makhmalbaf, Amir Naderi, Abolfazl Jalili, Jafar Panahi, Bahman Ghobadi, Rakhshan Bani-E'temad and Majid Majidi. The filmmakers share many common techniques including the use of poetic dialogue and allegorical storytelling dealing with political and philosophical issues with documentary style narrative films.
Barari's works are influenced by documentary filmmaker Morteza Avini and narrative film director Abbas Kiarostami, Who has a reputation for using child protagonists, for documentary style narrative films, for stories that take place in rural villages, and for conversations that unfold inside cars, using stationary mounted cameras. He is also known for his use of contemporary Iranian poetry in the dialogue, titles, and themes of his films.
"Barari is the unvarnished offspring of Kiarostami and Hitchcock!"

Filmography

City in the Hands of Children (1991)
The Nest (1992,Banned)
The Green Hell (1996)
The Devil's Dance (2000)
Dead Heat under the Shrubs (2004,Banned)
Day of Rain (2007)
Maryam's Report (2005/2011,Banned/Disbanded)
The Twelve Chairs (2011)

Festivals and awards

1988
REACTION (short film)
- 1st National Students Film Festival, Tehran; won the top prize

- Fajr Film Festival, Tehran

1989
REACTION (short film)
- Ebensee Festival of Nations, Austria; won the silver plaque

1991
LONELINESS AND THE CLOD (short film)
- 5th International Festival of Film and Video for Children and Young Adults, Tehran; Won The Golden Butterfly for the Best Film

- FIPA Cannes-91, France
City in the Hands of Children
- Fajr Film Festival, Tehran

1992
City in the Hands of Children
- 6th International Festival of Film and Video for Children and Young Adults, Isfahan

The Nest
- Fajr Film Festival, Tehran

1996
The Green Hell
- Fajr Film Festival

2000
The Devil's Dance
- Fajr Film Festival

2004
Dead Heat under the Shrubs
- 7th Brooklyn Int'l Film Festival, USA-New York

- Cinema Paradise Film Festival, USA-Hawaii

- 12th Raindance Film Festival, UK

- 6th Panorama, Greece-Thessaloniki

- 49th Valladolid Int'l Film Festival, Spain; Winner of Audience Award Best Film

- 7th Rehoboth Beach Independent film Festival, USA-Delaware

- 1st annual Turks & Caicos, USA

- 4th Anchorage Film Festival, USA-Alaska

- 4th Tiburon International Film Festival, USA

2005
Dead Heat under the Shrubs
 
- Festival del Cine Pobre, Cuba-Gibara

- Indianapolis International Film Festival, USA

2006
Dead Heat under the Shrubs
- Int'l Fest. of Muslim Cinema"Golden Minbar", Russia-Kazan

2007
Dead Heat under the Shrubs
- 9th Mumbai International Film Festival, India
Day of Rain
- Roosta Film Festival, Tehran; Won the Golden Plaque for the best film

- 21st International Children Film Festival, Hamedan; Mentioned for religious content

- 1st Quran Film Festival, Tehran; Won the Khademin QurF an Medal

- 25th International environmental film festival, Paris

- The 37th Roshd International Film Festival, Tehran/Nov.2007

References

External links 
 
World Iranian Film Center Official Website

1965 births
Living people
Iranian film directors
Iranian film producers
Esmael Barari